Niujie station is a subway station on Line 19 of the Beijing Subway. The station opened on December 31, 2021.

Platform Layout
The station has an underground island platform.

Exits
There are 3 exits, lettered B, C and D2. Exit C is accessible as it provides lift access.

References

External links

Beijing Subway stations in Xicheng District
Railway stations in China opened in 2021